John Francis Crowley (10 August 1891 - 22 October 1942) was an Irish revolutionary who holds the Guinness World Record for the longest hunger strike in history. From 11 August to 12 November 1920, Crowley, along with 10 others, underwent a hunger strike for 94 days in Cork County Gaol, demanding the reinstatement of their political status and release from prison. The 1920 Cork hunger strike took place at the same time as that of Terence MacSwiney, Lord Mayor of Cork.

He came from the prominent Irish republican Crowley family of Ballylanders, being the son of Timothy Crowley, and the brother of Tadhg Crowley and Peter Crowley, his fellow hunger striker.

References 

Irish revolutionaries
Irish hunger strikers
1891 births
1942 deaths